The following table indicates the party of elected officials in the U.S. state of Connecticut:
 Governor
 Lieutenant Governor
 Secretary of the State
 Attorney General
 State Treasurer
 State Comptroller

The table also indicates the historical party composition in the:
 State Senate
 State House of Representatives
 State delegation to the U.S. Senate
 State delegation to the U.S. House of Representatives

For years in which a presidential election was held, the table indicates which party's nominees received the state's electoral votes.

1639–1775

1776–1898

1899–present

See also 
 Politics in Connecticut

References 

 
Connecticut